Kujnik may refer to:
Kujnik, Brod-Posavina County
Kujnik, Požega-Slavonia County